Maiko Gogoladze (born 9 September 1991 in Orenburg, Russian SFSR) is a Georgian long jumper. She competed in the long jump event at the 2012 Summer Olympics.

References

1991 births
Living people
People from Orenburg
Olympic athletes of Georgia (country)
Athletes (track and field) at the 2012 Summer Olympics
Female long jumpers from Georgia (country)
European Games competitors for Georgia (country)
Athletes (track and field) at the 2015 European Games